Bettiah Raj was the second-largest zamindari in Bettiah region of Bihar, India . It generated annual land revenue rentals of more than 2 million rupees.

History

Before British rule
Gangeswar Deo, a  Brahmin of Jaitharia clan, popularly known as Jaitharia Bhumihar Brahmin. Gangeswar Deo descendants are among the present day Kashyap Gotra of Brahmins and a branch of this clan also set up residence at a place called Jaithar Saran near Champaran, later moved east and established a state at Bettiah in Bihar. They were known as Bhumihar Brahmin. Bettiah Raj was the oldest in the region and had also been a branch of Raj Riyasat Sirkar of Champaran since the 17th century (the time of Shah Jahan) when the raja of Bettiah was Ugrasen Singh. Both the Madhuban Raj and Sheohar estates had broken off from Bettiah Raj. even then making it the largest zamindari in Bihar.
The Rajas of Bettiah had turbulent relations with Khandavalas of Mithila , who often assisted the Nawab of Bengal in subduing the hostile chieftaincy of Bettiah. 

During the Bettiah Raj of Bihar, the ethnoreligious community of Bettiah Christians descended from upper-caste Hindu and Muslim converts to Christianity was established in India by missionaries belonging to the Order of Friars Minor Capuchin, a Roman Catholic religious order. It is one of the northern Indian subcontinent's oldest Christian communities that was founded after Raja Dhurup Singh requested Joseph Mary Bernini to heal his ill wife of a severe illness and was said to be successful in doing so. The Bettiah Christian Mission flourished under the blessing of Pope Benedict XIV and the patronage of the royal court of the Bettiah Rajas, growing in number.

Under the East India Company
In 1765, when the East India Company acquired the Diwani Bettiah Raj held the largest territory under its jurisdiction. It consisted of some part of Champaran except for a large portion held by the Ram Nagar Raj (held by Shah Rajputs). Bettiah Raj also came into being as a result of mallikana chaudharai and quanungoi, the connection with the revenue administration building on local dominance and the capability of controlling and protecting hundreds of villages. Internal disputes and family quarrels divided the Raj in course of time. Madhuban Raj was created as a consequence.

Under the British Raj
The last zamindar was Harendra Kishore Singh, who was born in 1854 and succeeded his father, Rajendra Kishore Singh in 1883. In 1884, he received the title of Raja Bahadur as a personal distinction and a Khilat and a sanad from the Lieutenant Governor of Bengal, Sir Augustus Rivers Thompson. He was created a Knight Commander of the Most Eminent Order of the Indian Empire on 1 March 1889. He was appointed a member of the Legislative Council of Bengal in January 1891. He was also a member of The Asiatic Society He was the last ruler of Bettiah Raj.

Raja Sir Harendra Kishore Singh Bahadur died issueless on 26 March 1893 leaving behind him two widows, Maharani Sheo Ratna Kunwar and Maharani Janki Kunwar. Maharani Sheo Ratna Kunwar who succeeded to the estate of Raja Harendra Kishore Singh on his death as his senior widow died on 24 March 1896 and on her death Maharani Janki Kunwar became entitled to the possession of the estate. Since it was found that Maharani Janki	Kunwar was not able to administer the estate, its management was taken over by the Court of Wards, Bihar in 1897. Maharani Janki Kunwar who was a limited holder of the estate died on 27 November 1954.

The Bettiah Raj forests were managed for timber production. Bihar state government took over management of the Bettiah Raj forests in 1953 and 1954 under the Bihar Private Protected Forests Act (1947). Valmiki National Park and Wildlife Sanctuary include portion of the former Bettiah Raj estate.

Bettiah Raj and music
The Bettiah Gharana is one of the three (others being Darbhanga Gharana, and Dumraon Gharana) oldest style of Dhrupad vocal song from the state of Bihar.

See also
Zamindars of Bihar

References

Zamindari estates
History of Bihar